The list of Colombian departments by area lists the departments of Colombia according to their respective areas.

Ranked by area total size

References
 
 
 

 
Colombia, area